Dissociation, as a concept that has been developed over time, is a wide array of experiences, ranging from a mild emotional detachment from the immediate surroundings, to a more severe disconnection from physical and emotional experiences. The major characteristic of all dissociative phenomena involves a detachment from reality, rather than a loss of reality as in psychosis.

The phenomena are diagnosable under the DSM-5 as a group of disorders as well as a symptom of other disorders through various diagnostic tools. Its cause is believed to be related to neurobiological mechanisms, trauma, anxiety, and psychoactive drugs. Research has further related it to suggestibility and hypnosis, and it is inversely related to mindfulness, which is a potential treatment.

History 
French philosopher and psychologist Pierre Janet (1859–1947) is considered to be the author of the concept of dissociation. Contrary to some conceptions of dissociation, Janet did not believe that dissociation was a psychological defense.

Psychological defense mechanisms belong to Sigmund Freud's theory of psychoanalysis, not to Janetian psychology. Janet claimed that dissociation occurred only in persons who had a constitutional weakness of mental functioning that led to hysteria when they were stressed. Although it is true that many of Janet's case histories described traumatic experiences, he never considered dissociation to be a defense against those experiences. Quite the opposite: Janet insisted that dissociation was a mental or cognitive deficit. Accordingly, he considered trauma to be one of many stressors that could worsen the already-impaired "mental deficiency" of a hysteric, thereby generating a cascade of hysterical (in today's language, "dissociative") symptoms.

Although there was great interest in dissociation during the last two decades of the nineteenth century (especially in France and England), this interest rapidly waned with the coming of the new century. Even Janet largely turned his attention to other matters.

There was a sharp peak in interest in dissociation in America from 1890 to 1910, especially in Boston as reflected in the work of William James, Boris Sidis, Morton Prince, and William McDougall. Nevertheless, even in America, interest in dissociation rapidly succumbed to the surging academic interest in psychoanalysis and behaviorism.

For most of the twentieth century, there was little interest in dissociation. Despite this, a review of 76 previously published cases from the 1790s to 1942 was published in 1944, describing clinical phenomena consistent with that seen by Janet and by therapists today. In 1971, Bowers and her colleagues presented a detailed, and still quite valid, treatment article. The authors of this article included leading thinkers of their time – John G. Watkins (who developed ego-state therapy) and Zygmunt A. Piotrowski (famed for his work on the Rorschach test). Further interest in dissociation was evoked when Ernest Hilgard (1977) published his neodissociation theory in the 1970s. During the 1970s and 1980s an increasing number of clinicians and researchers wrote about dissociation, particularly multiple personality disorder.

Carl Jung described pathological manifestations of dissociation as special or extreme cases of the normal operation of the psyche. This structural dissociation, opposing tension, and hierarchy of basic attitudes and functions in normal individual consciousness is the basis of Jung's Psychological Types. He theorized that dissociation is a natural necessity for consciousness as well.

Attention to dissociation as a clinical feature has been growing in recent years as knowledge of post-traumatic stress disorder (PTSD) increased, due to interest in dissociative identity disorder (DID), and as neuroimaging research and population studies show its relevance.

Historically the psychopathological concept of dissociation has also another different root: the conceptualization of Eugen Bleuler that looks into dissociation related to schizophrenia.

Diagnosis 

Dissociation is commonly displayed on a continuum. In mild cases, dissociation can be regarded as a coping mechanism or defense mechanism in seeking to master, minimize or tolerate stress – including boredom or conflict. At the non-pathological end of the continuum, dissociation describes common events such as daydreaming.  Further along the continuum are non-pathological altered states of consciousness.

More pathological dissociation involves dissociative disorders, including dissociative fugue and depersonalization disorder with or without alterations in personal identity or sense of self. These alterations can include: a sense that self or the world is unreal (depersonalization and derealization), a loss of memory (amnesia), forgetting identity or assuming a new self (fugue), and separate streams of consciousness, identity and self (dissociative identity disorder, formerly termed multiple personality disorder) and complex post-traumatic stress disorder. Although some dissociative disruptions involve amnesia, other dissociative events do not. Dissociative disorders are typically experienced as startling, autonomous intrusions into the person's usual ways of responding or functioning. Due to their unexpected and largely inexplicable nature, they tend to be quite unsettling.

Dissociative disorders are sometimes triggered by trauma, but may be preceded only by stress, psychoactive substances, or no identifiable trigger at all. The ICD-10 classifies conversion disorder as a dissociative disorder.  The Diagnostic and Statistical Manual of Mental Disorders groups all dissociative disorders into a single category and recognizes dissociation as a symptom of acute stress disorder, posttraumatic stress disorder, and borderline personality disorder.

Misdiagnosis is common among people who display symptoms of dissociative disorders, with an average of seven years to receive proper diagnosis and treatment. Research is ongoing into etiologies, symptomology, and valid and reliable diagnostic tools. In the general population, dissociative experiences that are not clinically significant are highly prevalent with 60% to 65% of the respondents indicating that they have had some dissociative experiences.

Diagnostic and Statistical Manual of Mental Disorders 
Diagnoses listed under the DSM-5 are dissociative identity disorder, dissociative amnesia, depersonalization/derealization disorder, other specified dissociative disorder and unspecified dissociative disorder. The list of available dissociative disorders listed in the DSM-5 changed from the DSM-IV-TR, as the authors removed the diagnosis of dissociative fugue, classifying it instead as a subtype of dissociative amnesia. Furthermore, the authors recognized derealization on the same diagnostic level of depersonalization with the opportunity of differentiating between the two.

The DSM-IV-TR considers symptoms such as depersonalization, derealization and psychogenic amnesia to be core features of dissociative disorders. The DSM-5 carried these symptoms over and described symptoms as positive and negative. Positive symptoms include unwanted intrusions that alter continuity of subjective experiences, which account for the first two symptoms listed earlier with the addition of fragmentation of identity. Negative symptoms include loss of access to information and mental functions that are normally readily accessible, which describes amnesia.

Peritraumatic dissociation 
Peritraumatic dissociation is considered to be dissociation that is experienced during and immediately following a traumatic event. Some of the symptoms include but are not limited to  depersonalization, derealization, dissociative amnesia, out-of-body experiences, emotional numbness, and altered time perception. This specific disorder has been related to self preservation and the body's natural instinct to protect itself.  Research is on-going related to its development, its importance, and its relationship to trauma, dissociative disorders, and predicting the development of PTSD.

Measurements 
Two of the most commonly used screening tools in the community are the Dissociative Experiences Scale and the Multiscale Dissociation Inventory. Meanwhile, the Structured Clinical Interview for DSM-IV – Dissociative Disorders (SCID-D) and its second iteration, the SCID-D-R, are both semi-structured interviews and are considered psychometrically strong diagnostic tools.

Other tools include the Office Mental Status Examination (OMSE), which is used clinically due to inherent subjectivity and lack of quantitative use. There is also the Dissociative Disorders Interview Schedule (DDSI), which lacks substantive clarity for differential diagnostics.

Peritraumatic dissociation is measured through the Peritraumatic Dissociative Scale.

Etiology

Neurobiological mechanism 
Preliminary research suggests that dissociation-inducing events, drugs like ketamine, and seizures generate slow rhythmic activity (1–3 Hz) in layer 5 neurons of the posteromedial cortex in humans (retrosplenial cortex in mice). These slow oscillations disconnect other brain regions from interacting with the posteromedial cortex, which may explain the overall experience of dissociation.

Trauma 
Dissociation has been described as one of a constellation of symptoms experienced by some victims of multiple forms of childhood trauma, including physical, psychological, and sexual abuse. This is supported by studies which suggest that dissociation is correlated with a history of trauma.

Dissociation appears to have a high specificity and a low sensitivity to having a self-reported history of trauma, which means that dissociation is much more common among those who are traumatized, yet at the same time there are many people who have suffered from trauma but who do not show dissociative symptoms.

Adult dissociation when combined with a history of child abuse and otherwise interpersonal violence-related posttraumatic stress disorder has been shown to contribute to disturbances in parenting behavior, such as exposure of young children to violent media. Such behavior may contribute to cycles of familial violence and trauma.

Symptoms of dissociation resulting from trauma may include depersonalization, psychological numbing, disengagement, or amnesia regarding the events of the abuse. It has been hypothesized that dissociation may provide a temporarily effective defense mechanism in cases of severe trauma; however, in the long term, dissociation is associated with decreased psychological functioning and adjustment.

Other symptoms sometimes found along with dissociation in victims of traumatic abuse (often referred to as "sequelae to abuse") include anxiety, PTSD, low self-esteem, somatization, depression, chronic pain, interpersonal dysfunction, substance abuse, self-harm and suicidal ideation or actions.  These symptoms may lead the victim to present the symptoms as the source of the problem.

Child abuse, especially chronic abuse starting at early ages, has been related to high levels of dissociative symptoms in a clinical sample, including amnesia for abuse memories.  It has also been seen that girls who suffered abuse during their childhood had higher reported dissociation scores than did boys who reported dissociation during their childhood. A non-clinical sample of adult women linked increased levels of dissociation to sexual abuse by a significantly older person prior to age 15, and dissociation has also been correlated with a history of childhood physical and sexual abuse.  When sexual abuse is examined, the levels of dissociation were found to increase along with the severity of the abuse.

A 2012 review article supports the hypothesis that current or recent trauma may affect an individual's assessment of the more distant past, changing the experience of the past and resulting in dissociative states.

Psychoactive substances 

Psychoactive drugs can often induce a state of temporary dissociation. Substances with dissociative properties include ketamine, nitrous oxide, alcohol, tiletamine, amphetamine, dextromethorphan, MK-801, PCP, methoxetamine, salvia, muscimol, atropine, ibogaine, and minocycline.

Psychoactive substances that cause temporary dissociation tend to be NMDA receptor antagonists or Κ-opioid receptor agonists. Although, this is not necessarily always the case and dissociation can occur with non-hallucinogenic drugs.

Correlations

Hypnosis and suggestibility 
There is evidence to suggest that dissociation is correlated with hypnotic suggestibility, specifically with dissociative symptoms related to trauma. However, the relationship between dissociation and hypnotic suggestibility appears to be complex and indicates further research is necessary.

Aspects of hypnosis include absorption, dissociation, suggestibility, and willingness to receive behavioral instruction from others. Both hypnotic suggestibility and dissociation tend to be less mindful, and hypnosis is used as a treatment modality for dissociation, anxiety, chronic pain, trauma, and more. Difference between hypnosis and dissociation: one is suggested, imposed by self or other, meaning dissociation is generally more spontaneous altering of awareness.

Mindfulness and meditation 
Mindfulness and meditation have shown an inverse relationship specifically with dissociation related to re-experiencing trauma due to the lack of present awareness inherent with dissociation. The re-experiencing episodes can include anything between illusions, distortions in perceived reality, and disconnectedness from the present moment. It is believed that the nature of dissociation as an avoidance coping or defense mechanism related to trauma inhibits resolution and integration.

Mindfulness and meditation also can alter the state of awareness to the present moment; however, unlike dissociation, it is clinically used to bring greater awareness to an individual's present state of being. It achieves this through increased abilities to self-regulate attention, emotion, and physiological arousal, maintain continuity of consciousness, and adopt an approach to the present experience that is open and curious. In practice, non-judgmental awareness has displayed a positive relationship with lower symptoms of PTSD avoidance, which can relate to greater opportunities for success with exposure therapy and lowering PTSD symptoms of hypervigilance, re-experiencing, and overgeneralization of fears.

When using mindfulness and meditation with people expressing trauma symptoms, it is crucial to be aware of potential trauma triggers, such as the focus on the breath. Often, a meditation session will begin with focused attention and move into open monitoring. With severe trauma symptoms, it may be important to start the meditation training and an individual session at the peripheral awareness, such as the limbs. Moreover, trauma survivors often report feeling numb as a protection against trauma triggers and reminders, which are often painful, making it good practice to start all trainings at the limbs as a gradual exposure to body sensations. Doing so will also increase physical attachment to the present moment and the sense of grounding, thereby increasing tolerance to trauma reminders and decreasing the need and use of dissociation.

Treatment 
When receiving treatment, patients are assessed to discover their level of functioning. Some patients might be higher functioning than others. This is taken into account when creating a patient's potential treatment targets. To start off treatment, time is dedicated to increasing a patient's mental level and adaptive actions in order to gain a balance in both their mental and behavioral action. Once this is achieved, the next goal is to work on removing or minimizing the phobia made by traumatic memories, which is causing the patient to dissociate. The final step of treatment includes helping patients work through their grief in order to move forward and be able to engage in their own lives. This is done with the use of new coping skills attained through treatment. One coping skill that can improve dissociation is mindfulness due to the introduction of staying in present awareness while observing non-judgmentally and increasing the ability to regulate emotions. Specifically in adolescents, mindfulness has been shown to reduce dissociation after practicing mindfulness for three weeks.

See also 

 Borderline personality disorder
 Cognitive dissonance
 Dissociative identity disorder
 Emotional detachment
 Fantasy prone personality
 International Society for the Study of Trauma and Dissociation
 Mind-wandering
 Repressed memory
 Splitting (psychology)
 Derealization

References

External links 

   International Society for the Study of Trauma and Dissociation 
 The official journal of the International Society for the Study of Dissociation (ISSD), published between 1988 and 1997

Dissociative disorders
Borderline personality disorder
Symptoms and signs of mental disorders
Psychological concepts
Defence mechanisms